Stephen Bruce (11 January 1954 – 12 December 2013) was a South African cricketer. He played first-class and List A matches for Orange Free State and Western Province between 1971 and 1987.

References

External links
 

1954 births
2013 deaths
South African cricketers
Free State cricketers
Western Province cricketers